Leiocithara potti is a species of sea snail, a marine gastropod mollusk in the family Mangeliidae.

Description
The length of the shell attains 12.4 mm.

Distribution
This species occurs in the Red Sea and off Eritrea.

References

 Sturany, R. "Diagnosen neuer Gastropoden aus dem Rothen Meere." Anzeiger der mathematisch-naturwissenschaftlichen Classe der Kaiserlichen Akademie der Wissen schaften, Wien 37 (1900): 197–201.
 Sturany R (1903) Expeditionen S.M. Schiff "Pola" in das Rothe Meer, nördliche und südliche Hälfte, 1895/96 – 1897/98. Zoologische Ergebnisse XXIII. Gastropoden des Rothen Meeres. Denkschriften der Kaiserlichen Akademie der Wissenschaften, Mathematisch-Naturwissenschaftliche Classe 74: 210–283.
  Albano P.G., Bakker P.A.J., Janssen R. & Eschner A. (2017). An illustrated catalogue of Rudolf Sturany’s type specimens in the Naturhistorisches Museum Wien, Austria (NHMW): Red Sea gastropods. Zoosystematics and Evolution. 93(1): 45-94

External links
  Tucker, J.K. 2004 Catalog of recent and fossil turrids (Mollusca: Gastropoda). Zootaxa 682:1-1295.

Endemic fauna of Eritrea
potti
Gastropods described in 1900